"So Alone" is a song recorded by American contemporary R&B group Men at Large and issued as the fourth single from the group's eponymous debut album. Released in 1992, the song peaked at No. 31 on the Billboard Hot 100 in 1993 and was the group's only song to appear on the chart; as well as the group's only pop hit.

Charts

References

External links
 
 

1992 singles
1992 songs
Men at Large songs
East West Records singles
Song recordings produced by Gerald Levert
Songs written by Gerald Levert